Barbier may refer to:

Barbier (surname)
Barbier (crater), a feature on the Moon
Barbier reaction, a reaction in organic chemistry
Barbier's theorem in mathematics